"Undisputed" is the second single off Ludacris' album, Theater of the Mind. The song features Floyd Mayweather Jr. The song was released on iTunes on October 14, 2008.

The song samples "We'll Find a Way" by Edwin Starr and Blinky Williams.

Music video
A music video was shot for "Undisputed". It features Ludacris, Floyd Mayweather Jr. and 6-year old boxer Pretty Boy Bam Bam.

Chart positions

References

External links
 

2008 singles
Ludacris songs
Songs written by Ludacris
2008 songs
Def Jam Recordings singles
Songs written by Ivory Joe Hunter
Song recordings produced by Don Cannon
Songs written by Don Cannon